Dejan Živković may refer to:

 Dejan Živković (footballer, born 1979), Serbian football player for FK Hajduk Beograd
 Dejan Živković (footballer, born 1982), Serbian football defender for FK Smederevo